Corethromyces elegans is a species of fungi in the family Laboulbeniaceae. A specimen at the University of Illinois Herbarium was found on Rhexius inculptus Lec. (ant-loving beetles or Pselaphinae) in La Salle County, Illinois, United States.

References

External links
 Corethromyces elegans at Index Fungorum

Laboulbeniaceae
Fungi described in 1931
Parasitic fungi
Parasites of insects
Taxa named by René Maire